Jean Vezin (30 July 1933 – 30 August 2020) was a French librarian and medievalist historian, specializing in Latin palaeography and codicology.

Biography 
Vezin was born in Vannes. A student at the École Nationale des Chartes, he obtained the archivist palaeographer diploma in 1958 with a thesis entitled Les scriptoria d’Angers au XIe siècle then joined the Casa de Velázquez.

A curator at the manuscript department of the Bibliothèque nationale de France from 1962 to 1974, he also taught palaeography at the Institute for Latin Studies of the Paris-Sorbonne University, as well as palaeography and codicology at the École nationale supérieure des sciences de l'information et des bibliothèques.

In 1974, he was elected a research director at the École pratique des hautes études. He was co-director of the Chartæ Latinæ Antiquiores and the Monumenta palæographica Medii Ævi.

He also headed the librarians-documentalists school of the Institut catholique de Paris from 1985 to 1998.

The author of more than two hundred articles, Vezin was elected a corresponding member of the Académie des Inscriptions et Belles-Lettres on 21 November 1997.

References

External links 
  La répartition du travail dans les « scriptoria » carolingiens on Persée
 Doctor honoris causa Jean Vézin

Writers from Vannes
1933 births
2020 deaths
French medievalists
French palaeographers
French librarians
Latin–French translators
Academic staff of the École pratique des hautes études
Commandeurs of the Ordre des Palmes Académiques
Commandeurs of the Ordre des Arts et des Lettres
École Nationale des Chartes alumni
Corresponding members of the Académie des Inscriptions et Belles-Lettres
French male non-fiction writers
20th-century French male writers
Codicologists